Eyeru Tesfoam Gebru (born 10 December 1996) is an Ethiopian professional racing cyclist. She rode in the women's road race and time trial at the UCI Road World Championships in 2017, 2018 and 2020.

References

External links

1996 births
Living people
Ethiopian female cyclists
Place of birth missing (living people)
21st-century Ethiopian women